Igor Zayats (born 8 January 1999) is a Belarusian professional footballer who plays for Slutsk.

Honours
Gomel
Belarusian Cup winner: 2021–22

References

External links 
 
 

1999 births
Living people
Belarusian footballers
Association football defenders
FC Dinamo Minsk players
FC Smolevichi players
FC Gomel players
FC Slutsk players